Qased (also Ghased) is a 2000-pound (900 kg) Iranian developed smart bomb.

Guidance 
Qased is a guided precision weapon, but it is not clear whether it is laser-guided or TV-guided. TV footage of its test-fire suggests it is TV-guided. It is thought to be for use with Iran's F-4 Phantom II fighter jets.

See also 
Military of Iran
Iran's missile forces
Iranian military industry
Equipment of the Iranian Army

References

External links 
 FARS News Agency, افتتاح خطوط توليد بمب هوشمند 2هزار پوندي قاصد [Production line inauguration photo gallery], 10 July 2011, 
 Youtube, Iran's Qassed-1 (GBU-78/A) [Qased Documentary], IR Iran, 27 April 2012, 

Aerial bombs of Iran
Guided bombs
Military equipment introduced in the 2000s